Joseph Tarife Durero (born in 1968 in Dapa) is a Philippine-born clergyman and bishop-elect for the Roman Catholic Diocese of Daru-Kiunga in Papua New Guinea. He was appointed bishop in May 2021 and will succeed Canadian Gilles Côté who vacated the post in November 2020. 

The authors of the bishop's coat of arms are Slovak heraldic artists Marek Sobola and Drahomír Velička.

References 

1968 births
Filipino Roman Catholic bishops
Roman Catholic bishops of Daru-Kiunga
Living people